Terence Raymond Lineen (5 January 1936 – 17 February 2020) was a New Zealand rugby union player. A second five-eighth and centre three-quarter, Lineen represented Auckland at a provincial level, and was a member of the New Zealand national side, the All Blacks, from 1957 to 1960. He played 35 matches for the All Blacks including 12 internationals.

Lineen died in Auckland on 17 February 2020 at the age of 84.

References

1936 births
2020 deaths
People educated at Sacred Heart College, Auckland
New Zealand rugby union players
New Zealand international rugby union players
Auckland rugby union players
Rugby union centres
Rugby union players from Auckland